Maine was admitted to the Union on  March 15, 1820. The state's U.S. senators belong to Class 1 and Class 2. Republican Susan Collins (first elected in 1996) and Independent Angus King (first elected in 2012) are Maine's current U.S. senators, making Maine one of seven states to have a split United States Senate delegation.

List of senators

|- style="height:2em"
! rowspan=4 | 1
| rowspan=4 align=left | John Holmes
| rowspan=3  | Democratic-Republican
| nowrap rowspan=4 | Jun 13, 1820 –Mar 3, 1827
| Elected in 1820.
| 1
| 
| rowspan=2 | 1
| rowspan=2 | Elected in 1820.
| nowrap rowspan=7 | Jun 14, 1820 –Mar 3, 1829
| rowspan=3  | Democratic-Republican
| rowspan=7 align=right | John Chandler
! rowspan=7 | 1

|- style="height:2em"
| rowspan=3 | Re-elected in 1821.
| rowspan=3 | 2
| 

|- style="height:2em"
| 
| rowspan=5 | 2
| rowspan=5 | Re-elected in 1823.Retired.

|- style="height:2em"
|  | NationalRepublican
| 
| rowspan=4  | Jacksonian

|- style="height:2em"
! 2
| align=left | Albion Parris
|  | Jacksonian
| nowrap | Mar 4, 1827 –Aug 26, 1828
| Elected in 1827.Resigned to become a judge on the Maine Supreme Judicial Court.
| rowspan=5 | 3
| rowspan=3 

|- style="height:2em"
| colspan=3 | Vacant
| nowrap | Aug 26, 1828 –Jan 15, 1829
|  

|- style="height:2em"
! rowspan=3 | 3
| rowspan=3 align=left | John Holmes
| rowspan=3  | NationalRepublican
| nowrap rowspan=3 | Jan 15, 1829 –Mar 3, 1833
| rowspan=3 | Elected to finish Parris's term.Retired.

|- style="height:2em"
| 
| rowspan=5 | 3
| rowspan=3 | Elected in 1829.Resigned.
| nowrap rowspan=3 | Mar 4, 1829 –Jan 1, 1835
| rowspan=3  | NationalRepublican
| rowspan=3 align=right | Peleg Sprague
! rowspan=3 | 2

|- style="height:2em"
| 

|- style="height:2em"
! rowspan=4 | 4
| rowspan=4 align=left | Ether Shepley
| rowspan=4  | Jacksonian
| nowrap rowspan=4 | Mar 4, 1833 –Mar 3, 1836
| rowspan=4 | Elected in 1833.Resigned to become Justice of the Maine Supreme Judicial Court.
| rowspan=6 | 4
| rowspan=3 

|- style="height:2em"
|  
| nowrap | Jan 1, 1835 –Jan 20, 1835
| colspan=3 | Vacant

|- style="height:2em"
| Elected to finish Sprague's term, having already been elected to the next term.
| nowrap rowspan=5 | Jan 20, 1835 –Mar 3, 1841
| rowspan=3  | Jacksonian
| rowspan=5 align=right | John Ruggles
! rowspan=5 | 3

|- style="height:2em"
| rowspan=2 
| rowspan=4 | 4
| rowspan=4 | Elected in 1835.Lost re-election.

|- style="height:2em"
! 5
| align=left | Judah Dana
|  | Jacksonian
| nowrap | Mar 4, 1836 –Mar 3, 1837
| Appointed to continue Shepley's term.Either lost election to finish the term or retired when elected successor qualified.

|- style="height:2em"
! rowspan=3 | 6
| rowspan=3 align=left | Reuel Williams
| rowspan=3  | Democratic
| nowrap rowspan=3 | Mar 4, 1837 –Feb 15, 1843
| Elected to finish Shepley's term.
| 
| rowspan=2  | Democratic

|- style="height:2em"
| rowspan=2 | Re-elected in 1839.Resigned.
| rowspan=5 | 5
| 

|- style="height:2em"
| rowspan=2 
| rowspan=5 | 5
| rowspan=5 | Elected in 1840.Lost re-election.
| nowrap rowspan=5 | Mar 4, 1841 –Mar 3, 1847
| rowspan=5  | Whig
| rowspan=5 align=right | George Evans
! rowspan=5 | 4

|- style="height:2em"
| rowspan=2 colspan=3 | Vacant
| nowrap rowspan=2 | Feb 15, 1843 –Dec 4, 1843
| rowspan=2 |  

|- style="height:2em"
| rowspan=2 

|- style="height:2em"
! rowspan=3 | 7
| rowspan=3 align=left | John Fairfield
| rowspan=3  | Democratic
| nowrap rowspan=3 | Dec 4, 1843 –Dec 24, 1847
| Elected to finish Williams's term.

|- style="height:2em"
| rowspan=2 | Re-elected in 1844 or 1845.Died.
| rowspan=6 | 6
| 

|- style="height:2em"
| rowspan=4 
| rowspan=6 | 6
| rowspan=6 | Elected in 1846.Retired.
| nowrap rowspan=6 | Mar 4, 1847 –Mar 3, 1853
| rowspan=6  | Democratic
| rowspan=6 align=right | James W. Bradbury
! rowspan=6 | 5

|- style="height:2em"
| colspan=3 | Vacant
| nowrap | Dec 24, 1847 –Jan 5, 1848
|  

|- style="height:2em"
! 8
| align=left | Wyman B. S. Moor
|  | Democratic
| nowrap | Jan 5, 1848 –June 7, 1848
| Appointed to continue Fairfield's term.Successor elected.

|- style="height:2em"
! rowspan=7 | 9
| rowspan=7 align=left | Hannibal Hamlin
| rowspan=6  | Democratic
| nowrap rowspan=7 | Jun 8, 1848 –Jan 7, 1857
| rowspan=2 | Elected to finish Fairfield's term.

|- style="height:2em"
| 

|- style="height:2em"
| rowspan=5 | Re-elected in 1851.Changed parties in 1856.Resigned to become Governor of Maine.
| rowspan=7 | 7
| 

|- style="height:2em"
| rowspan=2 
| rowspan=7 | 7
| Legislature failed to elect.
| nowrap | Mar 4, 1853 –Feb 10, 1854
| colspan=3 | Vacant

|- style="height:2em"
| rowspan=6 | Elected to finish term.
| nowrap rowspan=10 | Feb 10, 1854 –Jul 1, 1864
| rowspan=5  | Whig
| rowspan=10 align=right | William P. Fessenden
! rowspan=10 | 6

|- style="height:2em"
| rowspan=4 

|- style="height:2em"
|  | Republican

|- style="height:2em"
| colspan=3 | Vacant
| nowrap | Jan 7, 1857 –Jan 16, 1857
|  

|- style="height:2em"
! 10
| align=left | Amos Nourse
|  | Republican
| nowrap | Jan 16, 1857 –Mar 3, 1857
| Elected to finish Hamlin's term.

|- style="height:2em"
! rowspan=2 | 11
| rowspan=2 align=left | Hannibal Hamlin
| rowspan=2  | Republican
| nowrap rowspan=2 | Mar 4, 1857 –Jan 17, 1861
| rowspan=2 | Elected in 1857.Resigned to become Vice President of the United States.
| rowspan=4 | 8
| 
| rowspan=5  | Republican

|- style="height:2em"
| rowspan=2 
| rowspan=6 | 8
| rowspan=4 | Re-elected in 1859.Resigned to become U.S. Secretary of the Treasury.

|- style="height:2em"
! rowspan=7 | 12
| rowspan=7 align=left | Lot M. Morrill
| rowspan=7  | Republican
| nowrap rowspan=7 | Jan 17, 1861 –Mar 3, 1869
| rowspan=2 | Elected to finish Hamlin's term.

|- style="height:2em"
| 

|- style="height:2em"
| rowspan=5 | Re-elected in 1863.Lost re-election.
| rowspan=5 | 9
| rowspan=3 

|- style="height:2em"
|  
| nowrap | Jul 1, 1864 –Oct 27, 1864
| colspan=3 | Vacant

|- style="height:2em"
| Appointed to continue Fessenden's term.Elected in 1865 to finish Fessenden's term.Retired.
| nowrap | Oct 27, 1864 –Mar 3, 1865
|  | Republican
| align=right | Nathan A. Farwell
! 7

|- style="height:2em"
| 
| rowspan=5 | 9
| rowspan=3 | Elected in 1864 or 1865.Died.
| nowrap rowspan=3 | Mar 4, 1865 –Sep 8, 1869
| rowspan=3  | Republican
| rowspan=3 align=right | William P. Fessenden
! rowspan=3 | 8

|- style="height:2em"
| 

|- style="height:2em"
! rowspan=10 | 13
| rowspan=10 align=left | Hannibal Hamlin
| rowspan=10  | Republican
| nowrap rowspan=10 | Mar 4, 1869 –Mar 3, 1881
| rowspan=5 | Elected in 1869.
| rowspan=5 | 10
| rowspan=3 

|- style="height:2em"
|  
| nowrap | Sep 8, 1869 –Oct 30, 1869
| colspan=3 | Vacant

|- style="height:2em"
| Appointed to finish Fessenden's term.Elected in 1870 to finish Fessenden's term.
| nowrap rowspan=4 | Oct 30, 1869 –Jul 7, 1876
| rowspan=4  | Republican
| rowspan=4 align=right | Lot M. Morrill
! rowspan=4 | 9

|- style="height:2em"
| 
| rowspan=5 | 10
| rowspan=3 | Re-election year unknown.Resigned to become U.S. Secretary of the Treasury.

|- style="height:2em"
| 

|- style="height:2em"
| rowspan=5 | Re-elected in 1875.Retired.
| rowspan=5 | 11
| rowspan=3 

|- style="height:2em"
|  
| nowrap | Jul 7, 1876 –Jul 10, 1876
| colspan=3 | Vacant

|- style="height:2em"
| Appointed to finish Morrill's term.Elected in 1877 to finish Morrill's term.
| nowrap rowspan=4 | Jul 10, 1876 –Mar 5, 1881
| rowspan=4  | Republican
| rowspan=4 align=right | James G. Blaine
! rowspan=4 | 10

|- style="height:2em"
| 
| rowspan=5 | 11
| rowspan=3 | Elected to full term in 1877.Resigned to become U.S. Secretary of State.

|- style="height:2em"
| 

|- style="height:2em"
! rowspan=17 | 14
| rowspan=17 align=left | Eugene Hale
| rowspan=17  | Republican
| nowrap rowspan=17 | Mar 4, 1881 –Mar 3, 1911
| rowspan=5 | Elected in 1881.
| rowspan=5 | 12
| rowspan=3 

|- style="height:2em"
|  
| nowrap | Mar 5, 1881 –Mar 18, 1881
| colspan=3 | Vacant

|- style="height:2em"
| Elected to finish Blaine's term
| nowrap rowspan=16 | Mar 18, 1881 –Aug 8, 1911
| rowspan=16  | Republican
| rowspan=16 align=right | William P. Frye
! rowspan=16 | 11

|- style="height:2em"
| 
| rowspan=3 | 12
| rowspan=3 | Re-elected in 1883.

|- style="height:2em"
| 

|- style="height:2em"
| rowspan=3 | Re-elected in 1887.
| rowspan=3 | 13
| 

|- style="height:2em"
| 
| rowspan=3 | 13
| rowspan=3 | Re-elected in 1889.

|- style="height:2em"
| 

|- style="height:2em"
| rowspan=3 | Re-elected in 1893.
| rowspan=3 | 14
| 

|- style="height:2em"
| 
| rowspan=3 | 14
| rowspan=3 | Re-elected in 1895.

|- style="height:2em"
| 

|- style="height:2em"
| rowspan=3 | Re-elected in 1899.
| rowspan=3 | 15
| 

|- style="height:2em"
| 
| rowspan=3 | 15
| rowspan=3 | Re-elected in 1901.

|- style="height:2em"
| 

|- style="height:2em"
| rowspan=3 | Re-elected in 1905.Retired.
| rowspan=3 | 16
| 

|- style="height:2em"
| 
| rowspan=5 | 16
| rowspan=3 | Re-elected in 1907.Died.

|- style="height:2em"
| 

|- style="height:2em"
! rowspan=7 | 15
| rowspan=7 align=left | Charles Fletcher Johnson
| rowspan=7  | Democratic
| nowrap rowspan=7 | Mar 4, 1911 –Mar 3, 1917
| rowspan=7 | Elected in 1911.Lost re-election.
| rowspan=7 | 17
| rowspan=3 

|- style="height:2em"
|  
| nowrap | Aug 8, 1911 –Sep 23, 1911
| colspan=3 | Vacant

|- style="height:2em"
| Appointed to continue Frye's term.Elected in 1912 to finish Frye's term.Lost re-election.
| nowrap | Sep 23, 1911 –Mar 3, 1913
|  | Democratic
| align=right | Obadiah Gardner
! 12

|- style="height:2em"
| 
| rowspan=5 | 17
| rowspan=2 | Elected in 1913.Died.
| nowrap rowspan=2 | Mar 4, 1913 –Jun 16, 1916
| rowspan=2  | Republican
| rowspan=2 align=right | Edwin C. Burleigh
! rowspan=2 | 13

|- style="height:2em"
| rowspan=3 

|- style="height:2em"
|  
| nowrap | Jun 16, 1916 –Sep 12, 1916
| colspan=3 | Vacant

|- style="height:2em"
| rowspan=2 | Elected to finish Burleigh's term.
| nowrap rowspan=6 | Sep 12, 1916 –Aug 23, 1926
| rowspan=6  | Republican
| rowspan=6 align=right | Bert M. Fernald
! rowspan=6 | 14

|- style="height:2em"
! rowspan=14 | 16
| rowspan=14 align=left | Frederick Hale
| rowspan=14  | Republican
| nowrap rowspan=14 | Mar 4, 1917 –Jan 3, 1941
| rowspan=3 | Elected in 1916.
| rowspan=3 | 18
| 

|- style="height:2em"
| 
| rowspan=3 | 18
| rowspan=3 | Re-elected in 1918.

|- style="height:2em"
| 

|- style="height:2em"
| rowspan=5 | Re-elected in 1922.
| rowspan=5 | 19
| 

|- style="height:2em"
| rowspan=3 
| rowspan=5 | 19
| Re-elected in 1924.Died.

|- style="height:2em"
|  
| nowrap | Aug 23, 1926 –Nov 30, 1926
| colspan=3 | Vacant

|- style="height:2em"
| rowspan=3 | Elected to finish Fernald's term.Retired.
| nowrap rowspan=3 | Nov 30, 1926 –Mar 3, 1931
| rowspan=3  | Republican
| rowspan=3 align=right | Arthur R. Gould
! rowspan=3 | 15

|- style="height:2em"
| 

|- style="height:2em"
| rowspan=3 | Re-elected in 1928.
| rowspan=3 | 20
| 

|- style="height:2em"
| 
| rowspan=3 | 20
| rowspan=3 | Elected in 1930.
| nowrap rowspan=9 | Mar 4, 1931 –Jan 3, 1949
| rowspan=9  | Republican
| rowspan=9 align=right | Wallace H. White
! rowspan=9 | 16

|- style="height:2em"
| 

|- style="height:2em"
| rowspan=3 | Re-elected in 1934.Retired.
| rowspan=3 | 21
| 

|- style="height:2em"
| 
| rowspan=3 | 21
| rowspan=3 | Re-elected in 1936.

|- style="height:2em"
| 

|- style="height:2em"
! rowspan=6 | 17
| rowspan=6 align=left | Owen Brewster
| rowspan=6  | Republican
| nowrap rowspan=6 | Jan 3, 1941 –Dec 31, 1952
| rowspan=3 | Elected in 1940.
| rowspan=3 | 22
| 

|- style="height:2em"
| 
| rowspan=3 | 22
| rowspan=3 | Re-elected in 1942.Retired.

|- style="height:2em"
| 

|- style="height:2em"
| rowspan=3 | Re-elected in 1946.Resigned, having already lost renomination.
| rowspan=4 | 23
| 

|- style="height:2em"
| 
| rowspan=4 | 23
| rowspan=4 | Elected in 1948.
| nowrap rowspan=13 | Jan 3, 1949 –Jan 3, 1973
| rowspan=13  | Republican
| rowspan=13 align=right | Margaret Chase Smith
! rowspan=13 | 17

|- style="height:2em"
| rowspan=2 

|- style="height:2em"
| colspan=3 | Vacant
| nowrap | Dec 31, 1952 –Jan 3, 1953
|  

|- style="height:2em"
! rowspan=3 | 18
| rowspan=3 align=left | Frederick G. Payne
| rowspan=3  | Republican
| nowrap rowspan=3 | Jan 3, 1953 –Jan 3, 1959
| rowspan=3 | Elected in 1952.Lost re-election.
| rowspan=3 | 24
| 

|- style="height:2em"
| 
| rowspan=3 | 24
| rowspan=3 | Re-elected in 1954.

|- style="height:2em"
| 

|- style="height:2em"
! rowspan=11 | 19
| rowspan=11 align=left | Edmund Muskie
| rowspan=11  | Democratic
| nowrap rowspan=11 | Jan 3, 1959 –May 7, 1980
| rowspan=3 | Elected in 1958.
| rowspan=3 | 25
| 

|- style="height:2em"
| 
| rowspan=3 | 25
| rowspan=3 | Re-elected in 1960.

|- style="height:2em"
| 

|- style="height:2em"
| rowspan=3 | Re-elected in 1964.
| rowspan=3 | 26
| 

|- style="height:2em"
| 
| rowspan=3 | 26
| rowspan=3 | Re-elected in 1966.Lost re-election.

|- style="height:2em"
| 

|- style="height:2em"
| rowspan=3 | Re-elected in 1970.
| rowspan=3 | 27
| 

|- style="height:2em"
| 
| rowspan=3 | 27
| rowspan=3 | Elected in 1972.Lost re-election.
| nowrap rowspan=3 | Jan 3, 1973 –Jan 3, 1979
| rowspan=3  | Democratic
| rowspan=3 align=right | Bill Hathaway
! rowspan=3 | 18

|- style="height:2em"
| 

|- style="height:2em"
| rowspan=2 | Re-elected in 1976.Resigned to become U.S. Secretary of State.
| rowspan=5 | 28
| 

|- style="height:2em"
| rowspan=3 
| rowspan=5 | 28
| rowspan=5 | Elected in 1978.
| nowrap rowspan=11 | Jan 3, 1979 –Jan 3, 1997
| rowspan=11  | Republican
| rowspan=11 align=right | William Cohen
! rowspan=11 | 19

|- style="height:2em"
| colspan=3 | Vacant
| nowrap | May 7, 1980 –May 19, 1980
|  

|- style="height:2em"
! rowspan=8 | 20
| rowspan=8 align=left | George J. Mitchell
| rowspan=8  | Democratic
| nowrap rowspan=8 | May 19, 1980 –Jan 3, 1995
| rowspan=2 | Appointed to finish Muskie's term.

|- style="height:2em"
| 

|- style="height:2em"
| rowspan=3 | Elected to full term in 1982.
| rowspan=3 | 29
| 

|- style="height:2em"
| 
| rowspan=3 | 29
| rowspan=3 | Re-elected in 1984.

|- style="height:2em"
| 

|- style="height:2em"
| rowspan=3 | Re-elected in 1988.Retired.
| rowspan=3 | 30
| 

|- style="height:2em"
| 
| rowspan=3 | 30
| rowspan=3 | Re-elected in 1990.Retired.

|- style="height:2em"
| 

|- style="height:2em"
! rowspan=9 | 21
| rowspan=9 align=left | Olympia Snowe
| rowspan=9  | Republican
| nowrap rowspan=9 | Jan 3, 1995 –Jan 3, 2013
| rowspan=3 | Elected in 1994.
| rowspan=3 | 31
| 

|- style="height:2em"
| 
| rowspan=3 | 31
| rowspan=3 | Elected in 1996.
| nowrap rowspan=15 nowrap | Jan 3, 1997 –Present
| rowspan=15  | Republican
| rowspan=15 align=right | Susan Collins
! rowspan=15 | 20

|- style="height:2em"
| 

|- style="height:2em"
| rowspan=3 | Re-elected in 2000.
| rowspan=3 | 32
| 

|- style="height:2em"
| 
| rowspan=3 | 32
| rowspan=3 | Re-elected in 2002.

|- style="height:2em"
| 

|- style="height:2em"
| rowspan=3 | Re-elected in 2006.Retired.
| rowspan=3 | 33
| 

|- style="height:2em"
| 
| rowspan=3 | 33
| rowspan=3 | Re-elected in 2008.

|- style="height:2em"
| 

|- style="height:2em"
! rowspan=6 | 22
| rowspan=6 align=left | Angus King
| rowspan=6  | Independent
| nowrap rowspan=6 | Jan 3, 2013 –Present
| rowspan=3 | Elected in 2012.
| rowspan=3 | 34
| 

|- style="height:2em"
| 
| rowspan=3 | 34
| rowspan=3 | Re-elected in 2014.

|- style="height:2em"
| 

|- style="height:2em"
| rowspan=3 | Re-elected in 2018.
| rowspan=3 | 35
| 

|- style="height:2em"
| 
| rowspan=3 | 35
| rowspan=3 | Re-elected in 2020.

|- style="height:2em"
| 

|- style="height:2em"
| rowspan=2 colspan=5 | To be determined in the 2024 election.
| rowspan=2|36
| 

|- style="height:2em"
| 
| 36
| colspan=5 | To be determined in the 2026 election.

See also

 List of United States representatives from Maine
 United States congressional delegations from Maine
 Elections in Maine

References

 

 
United States Senators
Maine